The First Battle of Krasnoi was a battle fought on 14 August between Ney's French troops and Neverovsky's Russian troops. It ended with a victory for the French, but the Russians retreated in good order to Smolensk.

Prelude
Bagration had reinforced Neverovsky's troops with some cavalry and ordered him to cover Krasnoi and especially westwards the direction of Orsha.

Battle
Ney drove him out of Krasnoi and captured part of his artillery, the first trophies of the entire campaign. Neverovsky assembled his 6,000 to 7,000 men into a huge square Ney's cavalry could not break. The square moved across the field over a palisade fence and Ney's cavalry could not follow. Neverovsky's troops were able to get away in good order but left 1,500 men behind.

Aftermath
Neverovsky returned to Smolensk and reported. The battle of Smolensk started only two days later.

See also
List of battles of the French invasion of Russia

Notes

References

External links
 

Battles of the French invasion of Russia
Battles of the Napoleonic Wars
Battles involving France
Battles involving Russia
Conflicts in 1812
August 1812 events
1812 in the Russian Empire